There have been two baronetcies created for persons with the surname Williamson, one in the Baronetage of England and one in the Baronetage of the United Kingdom.

The Williamson Baronetcy, of East Markham in the County of Nottingham, was created in the Baronetage of England on 3 June 1642 for Thomas Williamson. He was a supporter of the Royalist cause in the Civil War, which loyalty resulted in the sequestration of all his Nottinghamshire estates, for which he compounded at a cost of £3400.

The family removed to County Durham as a consequence of marriage and from the 18th century the family seat was Whitburn Hall, near Sunderland ( the house was demolished in 1980). The fourth Baronet served as High Sheriff of Durham 1723–1747. The fifth (1747–88) and sixth Baronets (1789–1810) also served in that office. The seventh Baronet sat as Whig Member of Parliament (MP) for County Durham 1831–2, and Sunderland 1847 and was High Sheriff in 1840. The eighth Baronet represented Durham North in the House of Commons 1864–74. The ninth Baronet was High Sheriff in 1904. The title became extinct on the death of the eleventh Baronet in 2000.

The Williamson Baronetcy, of Glenogil in the County of Forfar, was created in the Baronetage of the United Kingdom on 29 July 1909. For more information on this creation, see the Baron Forres.

Williamson baronets, of East Markham (1642)

Sir Thomas Williamson, 1st Baronet (1609–1657)
Sir Thomas Williamson, 2nd Baronet (1636–1703)
Sir Robert Williamson, 3rd Baronet (died 1707)
Sir William Williamson, 4th Baronet (1681–1747)
Sir Hedworth Williamson, 5th Baronet (–1788)
Sir Hedworth Williamson, 6th Baronet (1751–1810)
Sir Hedworth Williamson, 7th Baronet (1797–1861)
Sir Hedworth Williamson, 8th Baronet (1827–1900)
Sir Hedworth Williamson, 9th Baronet (1867–1942)
Sir Charles Hedworth Williamson, 10th Baronet (1903–1946)
Sir Nicholas Frederick Hedworth Williamson, 11th Baronet (1937–2000)

Williamson baronets, of Glenogil (1909)
see Baron Forres

Notes

References
A General and Heraldic Dictionary of the Peerage and Baronetage of the British Empire Vol 1 4th Ed. John Burke (1832) p618 Google Books (Williamson of Markham)
Kidd, Charles, Williamson, David (editors). Debrett's Peerage and Baronetage (1990 edition). New York: St Martin's Press, 1990, 

Baronetcies in the Baronetage of the United Kingdom
Extinct baronetcies in the Baronetage of England
1642 establishments in England